Fernando Díaz Alberdi (born July 2, 1972 in Buenos Aires) is a former Argentine rugby union prop, now he has a Vice President position at Tenaris and resides in Dubai.

He was playing at Club Universitario de Buenos Aires team, when he was selected for the Argentina Squad that entered the 1999 Rugby World Cup finals. He was never used. He played 6 times for the "Pumas", from 1997 to 2000, scoring 1 try, 5 points in aggregate. He had to leave competition in 2001, due to a serious injury. While playing rugby, he studied in the Universidad Catolica Argentina, getting the Industrial Engineering degree in 1998.

After leaving the competition in 2001, he works in different companies of the Techint Group in different countries, including Kazakhstan, Norway and UAE.

He continues to be involved in rugby. He had coached the Club Universitario de Buenos Aires first team for five years, achieving four times the Semifinals of Buenos Aires Rugby Union (URBA) tournament. When moving to Kazakhstan in 2008, he has developed a youth rugby team in Almaty and advise the national team, which qualified to playoff stages. From 2013 to 2015, he coached a junior colt team in Stavanger (Norway). In 2015 he moved back to Argentina and coached different Club Universitario de Buenos Aires colt teams for three years. Currently in Dubai, he has been coaching different teams, including the development of girls rugby for UAE Hurricanes.

External links
Fernando Díaz Alberdi International Statistics

1972 births
Living people
Rugby union players from Buenos Aires
Argentine rugby union players
Argentine rugby union coaches
Rugby union props
Argentina international rugby union players